This is a list of players that participated in the women's wheelchair basketball competition at the Games of the XIV Paralympiad.

Group A

The following is the Australia roster in the women's wheelchair basketball tournament of the 2012 Summer Paralympics.





The following is the Great Britain roster in the women's wheelchair basketball tournament of the 2012 Summer Paralympics.



Group B











References

Women's team rosters
2012
Para